The AppleColor High-Resolution RGB Monitor is a 13" (12.8" viewable) Trinitron aperture grille CRT with a fixed resolution of 640x480 at 66.7Hz. It was released with the Macintosh II computer and manufactured by Apple Inc. from March 1, 1987, until December 1, 1992. It used a DA-15 video connector commonly used on Macintosh II family and later Macintosh computers and video cards. Two revisions were released: Rev. A (M0401), and Rev. B (M1297). Their features were identical.

References 

 EveryMac.com

Apple Inc. peripherals
Apple Inc. displays